Fatemeh Amineh Borazjani (born 3 June 1997) is an Iranian footballer who plays as a defender for Kowsar Women Football League club Shahrdari Sirjan and the senior Iran women's national team.

International career
Amineh Borazjani represented Iran at the 2013 AFC U-16 Women's Championship qualification, scoring twice. At senior level, she capped during the 2020 AFC Women's Olympic Qualifying Tournament.

References 

1997 births
Living people
Iranian women's footballers
Iran women's international footballers
Women's association football defenders
People from Bushehr Province
21st-century Iranian women